Azerbaijan Deposit Insurance Foundation (ADIF, Azerbaijani: Azərbaycan Əmanətlərin Sığortalanması Fondu) is a fund responsible for creation of a deposit insurance system, preventing the risk of loss of deposits of individuals in the event of loss of solvency by banks or branches of foreign banks, ensuring the stability and development of the financial and banking system of the Republic of Azerbaijan.

History 
The Foundation was established by the order of the President of Azerbaijan dated February 9, 2007 "On approval and introduction of the Law “On Deposit Insurance””, adopted by the National Assembly of Azerbaijan on December 29, 2006.

The main activities of the Foundation are to collect insurance premiums from banks, to ensure the safety of the fund's cash deposits and to pay insurance amounts to depositors in some cases.

Activity 
From March 1, 2016 to December 4, 2020, the insurance system applies to the entire volume of deposits of the population.

According to the decision of the Fund's Board of Trustees, starting from June 1, 2020, the maximum rate on bank deposits of the population in the national currency in Azerbaijan is increased from 10% to 12%.

Since 2020, the executive Director of the Foundation is Tural Piriyev.

See also 
Banking in Azerbaijan

References 

Deposit insurance
Banking in Azerbaijan